Staphylinochrous flavida is a species of moth of the Anomoeotidae family. It is found in the Democratic Republic of the Congo and Uganda.

References

External links
Images

Anomoeotidae
Insects of the Democratic Republic of the Congo
Insects of Uganda
Moths of Africa